Centennial is an instrumental LP released in 1984 by John Stewart, a former member of the Kingston Trio. This album is produced by Stewart and he also plays all instruments. The album was released on Stewart's own label "Homecoming Records". It is also the first part of his "American Journey" series, the others being The Last Campaign, The Trio Years and An American Folk Song Anthology.

The album was reissued on CD on the label "Laserlight" in 1991 as "American Sketches". Selection from Centennial was also released on the 1984 "Homecoming Records" sampler The Gathering.

Track listing
All compositions by John Stewart
Side one
 "The Plains" – 10:32
 "Distant Wagons" – 2:31
 "Witchita Cross Winds" – 4:17
 "Betsy From Pike" – 2:09
 "Indian Springs" – 1:35
 "The Wilderness" – 10:02
 "Grand Canyon Summer" – 2:09
 "The Hooliann" – 1:50
 "Montana Crossing" – 2:19
 "After The Rain" – 2:28
 "The Launch of Apollo 11" – 1:16

Side two
 "Behind The Wheel" – 8:20
 "The Gold Rush" – 5:44

Personnel
 John Stewart - all instruments

Additional personnel
 John Stewart - producer
 Fred Koch - engineer
 Stephen Marcussen - mastering
 Dean Comvell - cover: original artist
 Marci Wilson - painter
 Henry Diltz - photo

References

1984 albums
John Stewart (musician) albums
Albums recorded at Shangri-La (recording studio)